Raichak on Ganges (ROG) is a collection of hotel, resort, spa and theme based country homes beside the river Ganges, located at Raichak, 51 km from Kolkata, in the state of West Bengal in eastern India. The properties located in ROG are Ganga Kutir, Anaya, The Ffort Raichak and The Ffort Suites. It is a 100-acre project developed by Ambuja Realty.

The Ffort Raichak

Opened in 1997 in West Bengal, the Ffort Raichak stands amidst 65 acres of landscaped greenery against the backdrop of the Hooghly River. The resort has an old fort theme, the entire facade is composed of old narrow bricks brought from Kolkata, typical of historic forts, giving it the look of an ancient fort.

Ganga Kutir

Ganga Kutir, inspired by Sri Lankan architecture, was conceptualized by Harshvardhan Neotia and designed by Channa Daswatte, a leading architect, of Sri Lanka.

Ganga Awas

Ganga Awas is a collection of theme based country homes within the premises of ROG at Raichak.

References

External links 
 http://raichakonganges.com/
 http://www.gangakutir.com/

Hotels in Kolkata
Resorts in India